Vrindavana Dasa Thakura or Brindaban Das (1507–1589) was the author of the Chaitanya Bhagavata, the first full-length biography of Chaitanya Mahaprabhu written in the Bengali language.

Early life
Vrindavana Dasa was born in Mamgachi in the Navadvipa area of West Bengal. His mother was Narayani, the niece of Srinivasa Acarya, a direct follower of Chaitanya Mahaprabhu. Vrindavana Dasa’s father, Vaikunthanatha Vipra, was from Sylhet in East Bengal. However, it is said that his father died before he was born and so his mother moved to the house of Srivasa in Mayapura. In his youth Vrindavana Dasa took initiation from Nityananda, one of the main associates of Chaitanya and he was apparently the last disciple that Nityananda accepted.

Chaitanya Bhagavata
In 1535, Vrindvana Dasa wrote the Chaitanya Bhagavata, a biography of Chaitanya Mahaprabhu. Initially, the Chaitanya Bhagavata was named Chaitanya Mangala. However the poet Lochana Dasa also wrote a work with this title. Therefore, the leading Vaishnavas in Vrindavana met and decided that henceforth Vrindavana Dasa's book would be known as the Chaitanya Bhagavata, and Lochana Dasa’s book would remain as the Chaitanya Mangala.

Praise of Vrindavana Dasa
Vrindavana Dasa is considered by Gaudiya Vaishnavas as the Vyasa of Chaitanya’s pastimes, since he was the first to reveal that Chaitanya was God himself and not just an incarnation of Godhead.

It would seem that the Chaitanya Bhagavata was the only major work written by Vrindavana Dasa. There are a number of other works attributed to him but their authorship has not been validated.

See also
 Gaudiya Vaishnavism
 Hare Krishna
 Six Goswamis
 Chaitanya Bhagavata

Bibliography
 Tirtha, Swami B.B., Sri Caitanya and His Associates, 2002, Mandala Publishing, San Francisco. 
 Mahayogi Swami B.V., Lives of the Saints, translated from Gaura Parsada Citravali, unpublished work.
 Sahitya Academi site (https://web.archive.org/web/20080914033637/http://www.sahitya-akademi.gov.in/old_version/glos.htm)
 Encyclopaedia Of Bangladesh (Set Of 30 Vols.) By Nagendra Kr. Singh - Page 309

External links
 Sri Caitanya Bhagavata Read On-line/Download

Gaudiya religious leaders
1507 births
1589 deaths
16th-century Indian writers
Bengali-language writers
Bengali Hindus
Writers from West Bengal
Bengali writers